Xi'an University of Science and Technology is a university located in Xi'an. The university has a relative history, the earliest history started from the North Ocean University, which was founded in 1895. In July 1938, the Industry faculty of North Ocean University merged with Mining and Metallurgy faculty of Northwest University. In 1957, the Mining and Metallurgy faculty of Northwest was distributed to Xi'an Jiaotong University. On September 15, 1958, the Xi'an Mining Industry College was founded on the foundation of mining industry faculty and geology faculty of Xi'an Jiaotong University. The former president of China Academy of Science Guo Moro named the college. With the approval of the Education Ministry of China, the college was distributed to the Government of Shaanxi Province and the name of the college was changed to Xi'an University of Science and Technologies in June 1999.

The institution currently has two campuses: one in Xi'an city and one in Lintong.

References

1895 establishments in China
Educational institutions established in 1895
Universities and colleges in Xi'an